Simone Antonini (born 12 February 1991) is an Italian former professional racing cyclist, who rode professionally between 2014 and 2018 for the  and  squads.

Major results

2008
 1st Trofeo Guido Dorigo
 7th GP Dell'Arno
 9th Trofeo Emilio Paganessi
 9th Trofeo Buffoni
2009
 1st  Overall Giro della Lunigiana
 9th Overall Giro della Toscana
2014
 1st  Overall Giro del Friuli-Venezia Giulia
1st Stage 1a (TTT)

References

External links
 

1991 births
Living people
Italian male cyclists
People from Empoli
Cyclists from Tuscany
Sportspeople from the Metropolitan City of Florence